Slovenia competed at the 2017 World Games in Wrocław, Poland, from July 20, 2017, to July 30, 2017.

Competitors

Boules Sports
Slovenia  has qualified at the 2017 World Games:

Lyonnaise Men's Singles Progressive Shooting- 1 quota

Ju-Jitsu
- Benjamin Lah
- Tim Toplak
- Patricija Delač
- Sara Besal

Muay Thai
- Rok Eršte

Sport Climbing
Slovenia has qualified at the 2017 World Games:

Women's Lead – Mina Markovič, Janja Garnbret
Men's Lead – Domen Škofic

References 

Nations at the 2017 World Games
2017 in Slovenian sport
2017